Sir Maurice FitzGerald, 18th Knight of Kerry (29 December 1774 – 7 March 1849) was an hereditary knight and an Irish Whig politician.

Early life
Sir Maurice FitzGerald was born on 29 December 1774 to Robert FitzGerald, 17th Knight of Kerry (1717–1781) and his third wife, Catherine Sandes, the daughter of Lancelot Sandes. Upon his father's death in 1781, the seven-year-old Maurice assumed the title of Knight of Kerry.

Sir Maurice inherited the Fitzgerald family estates in Co. Kerry, which included residences and lands at Ballinruddery near Listowel, and Glanleam House on Valentia Island. Sir Maurice developed the famous Valentia slate quarry on the island. The blue-coloured slate was especially in demand for billiard tables. It was also widely sought as a roofing slate given its attractive blue shade, and was used on roofs of some of the most famous buildings of the day, such as the Paris Opera House, Westminster Abbey, St Paul's Cathedral and the new Palace of Westminster.  

Sir Maurice was an enthusiastic botanist, recognised the unique potential of the island’s microclimate for sub-tropical plants and laid out a fifty-acre garden, using species just introduced from South America. His efforts won him great acclaim at the time and today his gardens have matured into dense woodlands.

In the Spring of 1848, English poet Alfred, Lord Tennyson paid a visit to the 18th Knight of Kerry on Valentia Island, having procured a letter of introduction from Sir Maurice's cousin, the Limerick poet Aubrey Thomas de Vere. In a footnote in his father's memoir, Tennyson's eldest son Hallam Tennyson includes a letter from Bewicke Blackburne who was supervising Valencia Island's quarry at that time. Here Bewicke includes many interesting details of Tennyson's visit to Valentia, and comments about Sir Maurice (Hallam Tennyson, Tennyson, A Memoir, 1898, pp. 1:291-292). In addition, Aubrey T. de Vere also describes his cousin Sir Maurice in Hallam's memoir: "Alfred Tennyson's desire to see cliffs and waves revived, and we sent him to our cousin, Maurice FitzGerald, Knight of Kerry, who live at Valentia where they are seen at their best. . . . The next morning he pursued his way alone to Valencia. He soon wrote that he had enjoyed it. He had found there the highest waves that Ireland knows, cliffs that at one spot rise to the height of 600 feet, tamarisks and fuchsias that no sea winds can intimidate, and the old 'Knight of Kerry,' who, at the age of nearly 80, preserved the spirits, the grace and the majestic beauty of days gone by -- as chivalrous a representative of Desmond's great Norman House as it had ever put forth in those times when it fought side by side with the greatest Gaelic Houses, for Ireland's ancient faith, and the immemorial rights of its Palatinate." (de Vere qtd. in H. Tennyson, 1898, p.1:291).

Blackburne writes of Sir Maurice at the time of Tennyson's visit that: "[No one] will hardly have forgotten the old Knight of Kerry, the owner of the Island, his dignified presence and his redolence of Grattan and John Philpot Curran and Castlereagh and the Irish Parliament in which he sat for many years" (Blackburne qtd. in H. Tennyson, 1898, p. 1:292fn).

Career
Sir Maurice FitzGerald represented Kerry in the Irish House of Commons from 1795 until the Act of Union in 1801. He sat also for Tralee in 1800. Travelling in Belgium during the Waterloo Campaign of 1815, he brought news of the impending Battle of Waterloo from Ghent to London. He was appointed joint Civil Lord of the Admiralty from 1834 to 1835.

Personal life
On 5 November 1801, FitzGerald married Maria la Touche, the daughter of the Right Hon. David la Touche of Marlay in Dublin. Maria's brother was Peter La Touche (1775–1830), a Member of Parliament in 1802–1806. Together, they had 10 children:
Maurice FitzGerald (died 1836), unmarried.
David FitzGerald (died 1848), unmarried.
Robert FitzGerald (died 1835), married Ellen Hussey, eldest daughter Peter Bodkin Hussey of Farranikilla House, County Kerry.
Brinsley FitzGerald (died 1832), unmarried.
Sir Peter FitzGerald (1808–1880) 19th Knight of Kerry, who married Julia Hussey, another daughter of Peter Bodkin Hussey.
Stephen Edward FitzGerald (1816–?), who married Margaret Story, daughter of Rev. R. Story.
Elizabeth Emily FitzGerald (died 1860), married Cofton Thomas Vandeleur.
Maria FitzGerald
Gertrude FitzGerald (died 1828), unmarried.
Catherine FitzGerald, who married Colonel Edward Symes Bayly, the High Sheriff of Wicklow in 1837.
After Maria's death in 1829, he married the widow, Cecilia Maria Knight, who died in 1859.

References

Sources

 (Ireland)

Irish knights
Maurice
1774 births
1849 deaths
Irish MPs 1790–1797
Irish MPs 1798–1800
People from County Kerry
Members of the Parliament of Ireland (pre-1801) for County Kerry constituencies
Members of the Parliament of the United Kingdom for County Kerry constituencies (1801–1922)
UK MPs 1801–1802
UK MPs 1802–1806
UK MPs 1806–1807
UK MPs 1807–1812
UK MPs 1812–1818
UK MPs 1818–1820
UK MPs 1820–1826
UK MPs 1826–1830
UK MPs 1830–1831
Fellows of the Royal Society
Members of the Privy Council of Ireland
Commissioners of the Treasury for Ireland
Lords of the Admiralty